Shi Jinmo (March 28, 1881 – August 22, 1969), former name Shi Yuqian, was a practitioner of traditional Chinese medicine. His ancestral hometown was Kanshan Town, Xiaoshan, Zhejiang, and he was born in Guizhou Province. He advocated the integration of traditional Chinese medicine into Western modern medicine.

Early life
In 1884, Shi began learning Chinese medicine from his uncle. He enrolled at the Shanxi Grand Academy (now Shanxi University) in 1902 but was expelled due to his dissent from the principal's campaign.

Career 
From 1903 to 1906, he studied at Shanxi Judicial and Political Academy. After graduation, he joined the Capital Judicial and Political Academy, while starting his medical practice. During that time, Shi actively supported Xinhai Revolution, and devoted to social welfare. In 1912, as a delegate from Shanxi, Shi attended the inauguration ceremony of the Temporary President of the Republic of China, Sun Yat-sen. Later, he assisted Huang Xing to draft the army's military law.

In 1930, he co-founded Beiping National Medical College along with Xiao Longwen and Kong Bohua; that school closed in 1944.  Just two years after Beiping National Medical College had been founded, Shi had a disagreement with Kong about the school's direction, and left to establish the North China National Medical Academy. The Beijing School for the Further Education of Chinese National Practitioners (also called the "Beijing Chinese Medical Improvement School") was established on the site of the North China National Medical Academy in 1950.

Shi advocated for TCM to become more rigorous and worked to standardize the names and diagnostic patterns used in TCM; he also worked to ground TCM practice and training in anatomy, physiology, pharmacology, and other basic sciences of medicine and implemented that in the curriculum of his schools.

Due to the ominous political atmosphere, Shi attained his belief that "if one can not be a good minister, be a good doctor", and thus concentrated on his medical practice. He broke one character in his name, Qian, and adopted Jinmo as his name, incarnating the spirit of "shared love" of Mozi and the medicinal canon of Mozi.

Shi was persecuted in Cultural Revolution. His health seriously deteriorated in spring 1969, and he died on August 22 in Beijing.

Family 
Shi financed his niece Lu Shijia's studies at the University of Göttingen in Germany under Ludwig Prandtl. Lu later became a renowned physicist who founded the aerodynamics program at Beihang University, the first in China.

References

1881 births
1969 deaths
Republic of China politicians from Guizhou
Members of the 1st Legislative Yuan
Victims of the Cultural Revolution
Traditional Chinese medicine practitioners
Physicians from Guizhou